Bute–Warner–Truax Farm is a historic farm complex and national historic district located at Charlotteville in Schoharie County, New York.  The district includes three contributing buildings, one contributing site, and two contributing structures.  It includes a Greek Revival style farmhouse built about 1853.  Also included is a milk house (ca. 1910), auto garage (ca. 1920), fire pond (ca. 1920), and 19th-century family burial plot.

It was added to the National Register of Historic Places in 1985.

References

Historic districts on the National Register of Historic Places in New York (state)
Historic districts in Schoharie County, New York
National Register of Historic Places in Schoharie County, New York
Farms on the National Register of Historic Places in New York (state)